Forgery is an album by the American alternative rock band Monks of Doom, released in 1992. It was the band's first album to be distributed by a major label, and their second after the breakup of the members' former band, Camper Van Beethoven.

Production
A loose concept album about fabrication and deception, Forgery was produced by Dan Fredman. "Tanguedia" and its reprise are tributes to the Argentine musician Astor Piazzolla.

Critical reception

Trouser Press wrote that "it’s a tight and cleanly played record but, as with the Monks’ entire oeuvre, the literate songs and sounds come too often from the head and too rarely from the heart." Guitar Player deemed the album "modern psychedelia for the smart drug generation." The Province considered the album's songs to be "projections of a modern, unfussy but subtly complex expression of progressive-rock." The Chicago Tribune concluded that Forgery "is something indulgent and bloodless, with bassist Victor Krummenacher delivering crypto-important metaphors that fail to touch any nerves."

Stereo Review called it "pretentious undergrad rock reminiscent of Camper at its most terminally twee." The Milwaukee Journal praised the album's first track, "Flint Jack", describing it as "a ska beat rumbling in slow motion under some spry, acrobatic guitar sprints." The Philadelphia Daily News declared that "Forgery is one pop product that dares to be art and actually succeeds." The St. Louis Post-Dispatch stated that Monks of Doom have "once again abandoned standard rock decorum to explore new music worlds via thrashing guitar leads, primitive synthesizers and acoustic guitars, and rippling syncopations."

AllMusic wrote that it combines "the quirky, off-kilter elements of Camper with a more streamlined, straightforward rocking approach."

Track listing

Personnel
David Immerglück - guitars, backing vocals, organ, synthesizer, mandolin
Greg Lisher - guitar, backing vocals, piano
Victor Krummenacher - bass, lead vocals, organ, piano, guitar
Chris Pedersen - drums, percussion, typewriter

References

1992 albums
I.R.S. Records albums